Australomisidia elegans is a species of spiders in the family Thomisidae. It is found in Australia.

References 

 Australomisidia elegans at Atlas of Living Australia

Thomisidae
Spiders described in 1876
Spiders of Australia